The state of Utah has an increasingly diverse population, home to hundreds of thousands of Hispanic/Latino people who share ancestry from Latin American countries. It is estimated that there are roughly 383,400 residents of Hispanic/Latino descent currently living in Utah.

Brief History

Spanish explorers and Mexican beginnings 
Possibly the first Spanish expedition into the lands now known as Utah was in 1541, captained by Garci-Lopez de Cardenas, and recorded by Francisco de Coronado. Utah was incorporated into the Province of Las Californias.

In 1776 the government of New Spain authorized friars Silvestre Velez de Escalante and Francisco Atanacio Dominguez to explore territory controlled by the Utes, now modern day Colorado, Utah, and northern New Mexico. Five Mexican Indians (or mestizos, men of mixed race of Spanish and indigenous descent) accompanied them “as guides, interpreters, and keepers of horses and mules.” The expedition aimed to find a route to connect Santa Fé and Monterey as well as to convert the Utes to Christianity. The Spaniards gave Spanish names to places they encountered that were later changed by the Mormon pioneers.

After Mexico’s war of independence against Spain started in 1810 and Mexico reclaimed all Spanish possessions (including the area controlled by the Utes), rivalry developed between Anglo-American traders in the area and Mexicans. After Mexico declared independence from Spain, the area officially became part of the Mexican territory and Mexicans were actively involved in Utah while making no threat to Ute claims on the land. This continued uninterrupted until 1847 and the arrival of the Mormons, followed by the United States annexation of the territory of Utah with the signing of the Treaty of Guadalupe Hidalgo in 1848.

Latin American Immigration to Utah 
Since its foundation in 1894, Carbon County attracted a diverse group of immigrants as sheepherders, railroad laborers, and coal miners. The Mexicans and the Mexican Americans continued to grow in numbers throughout the years. Hispanic presence at the end of the nineteenth century played an instrumental role in the development of cattle, sheep, and mining industries and in the irrigation systems of Utah.

In 1900 the United States Census listed only forty individuals of Mexican nativity living in Utah. Spanish-speaking families began to establish homes in Monticello, find employment at Bingham Copper Mine in the Salt Lake Valley, work in the Carbon County coal mines, and find their place in other locations in Utah as new economic opportunities emerged with World War I. In the 1910 Utah Census, there was a total of 199 Spanish-speaking people reported in the state. The 1910 Census reported 184 total people from Mexico living in Utah at the time The new century brought many Hispanic immigrants, often from Mexico escaping the Revolution of Mexico. Many immigrants settled in Weber County in Northern Utah during this time due to the abundance of railroad and mining jobs. Across the United States, Latino immigration boomed post-World War II. By 1980, the official count placed Hispanics at 4.1 percent of the population of the state, or 69.260 individuals.

In the 1990s alone, the Latino population of Utah grew by 138 percent. A government focus on tourism in the towns of Park City, Wendover, and others in Utah caused a surge of new jobs that attracted a Hispanic population that would come to call these regions home. Some communities in northern Utah in the 1990s saw a 300 percent increase in Latino population. The lack of diversity in this immigration destination has increased a sense of racial-ethnic otherness that is not observed in more traditional immigrant destinations, that tend to be urban melting pots.

Current Demographics 
The 2010 US Census Bureau estimates the Hispanic/Latino population to be about 14.2% of the total population of the state of Utah, which in 2010 was over 2.7 million. Just as the overall population of Utah is growing, the amount of Hispanics in Utah is also growing, and the Latino population is increasing at a higher rate than the white non-Latino population.

According to the 2010 Census, Utah ranks 11th in the United States for percent of Latino people per capita.

The Utah city with the most Hispanic residents in 2020 is West Valley City with over 51,000 Hispanic/Latino residents. 

According to the Kem C Gardner Policy at the University of Utah and The United States Census Bureau, more of Utah’s hispanic population is the result of reproduction in the United States rather than immigration from a Latin/Hispanic country. It is estimated that the Hispanic/Latino population in Utah accounts for 0.7% of the nation’s entire Hispanic population.

According to the 2010 census, Hispanics are majority in Beryl Junction (51.8%), Wendover (68.3%) and Hideout (77.0%).

Ancestries

Utah Cities with Latino Population of at least 15% of total population

Salt Lake County 

West Valley City- 38.14%
Midvale- 23.57%
Salt Lake City- 21.63%
Taylorsville- 23.11%
West Jordan-19.08%
 South Salt Lake City- 16.27%

Weber County 

Ogden- 32.47%
 Roy- 16.41%
Riverdale- 15.01%

Utah County 

Provo- 16.62%
Orem-16.54%
Springville- 15.59%
Santaquin- 15.12%

Summit County 

 Park City-18.25%

Davis County 

Clearfield- 19.02%
 Sunset- 18.07

Cache County 

 Hyrum- 17.01%
Logan- 15.44%

Wasatch County 

Heber City-17.9%

Salt Lake County in northern Utah has the highest density of Latino people in the state of Utah.

Latino Community in Utah

Utah Hispanic Chamber of Commerce 
This community has created a space and web of Hispanic business people to allow for greater opportunities for job seekers and prospective employees of Latin Heritage in the state of Utah. Founded in 1991, the organization offers scholarships to local college students, recognizes prominent Hispanic business employees in the area, as well as hosting events to allow for networking between its members and specific career fields within the realm of business. Based upon holding a membership to the organization, members have access to helpful tools to help further their careers.

Cultural Events in Utah

Festival LatinoAmericano 
The annual four-day festival of Festival LatinoAmericano during Labor Day weekend celebrates all things Latin culture from a variety of countries. It is located in downtown Provo, Utah. The festival features prominent speakers and entertainers, many ethnic food opportunities, as well as performances from local dance/music groups.

Midvale Cinco De Mayo
This annual festival in Midvale, Utah, established in 1988, celebrates the Mexican holiday Cinco de Mayo. This festival takes place the first weekend in May and offers many performers such as bailé folklorico (traditional dancing), mariachi bands, as well as known hispanic singers and bands. The festival boasts a variety of local Mexican food vendors as well as activities such as bingo and inflatable bounce- houses for children to play in.

Utah Cultural Celebration Center 
The Utah Cultural Celebration Center hosts an annual celebration and education of Mexican Holiday, día de los muertos, in West Valley City. The event takes place the weekend surrounding the holiday (October 31-November 2) and provides traditional means of celebrating the holiday featuring authentic Mexican music and dance, relevant arts and crafts for the family as well as a La Catarina dress up contest.

Día de los muertos at Thanksgiving Point

This annual one day celebration at Thanksgiving Point event center in Lehi, Utah provides an experience complete with traditional food, dance, storytelling, music, as well as a community altar (ofrenda) to pay tribute to deceased loved ones.

Hispanic Heritage Festival 

This festival is an annual two-day event located at the Gateway shopping center in downtown Salt Lake City. The event contains a parade with cultural dancers, musicians as well as small floats. There is also a street fair with vendors selling cultural Latin cuisine as well as homemade cultural items. The street fair offers a variety of booths, family activities and crafts, and live music.

Historic Hispanic/Latino population (1900-2020)

Legacy

Current Spanish place names 

San Juan County ( St John in Spanish), Escalante (Spanish surname), Santa Clara (Saint Clare de Assisi), Alta (high in Spanish), Pintura (painting in Spanish), Santa Clara Volcano, Callao Ghost Town (named for a town in Peru), Santa Clara River.

Influential Latinos in Utah

Senators 

Luz Escamilla- Democrat- District 1 Since January 2009.

Ross Romero-Democrat- District 7 2006-2012

Pete Suazo- 1996-2001- Democrat- First Latino Senator to be elected to the Utah State Senate

Representatives 
Rebecca Chavez-Houck- Democrat- District 24. 2008-2018

Angela Romero- Democrat- District 26 since 2013

Other Elected Officials 
Arlene Anderson - Ogden School Board, District 1 since 2021.

Silivia Catten - Millcreek City Council, District 1 since 2018.

Joél-Léhi Organista - Salt Lake City School Board, District 1 since 2021.

Nate Salazar - Salt Lake City School Board, District 4 since 2019.

Ana Valdemoros - Salt Lake City Council, District 4 since 2019.

Celebrities 

David Archuleta- Singer/Songwriter, appearing on American Talent Contest, American Idol

Athletes 
Julian Vazquez- Professional Soccer player for Real Salt Lake

Long Guitierrez Feng- Swimmer 2016 Rio de Janeiro Olympics

Emil Cuello- Professional Soccer Player for the LA Galaxy

Jared Fernandez- Former MLB Pitcher for the Cincinnati Reds, Houston Astros, and Milwaukee Brewers

References 

Ethnic groups in Utah